Two ships of the Royal Navy have borne the name HMS Bryony, after the flower Bryony:

  was an  sloop, launched in 1917 and broken up in 1938.
  was a  launched in 1941.  She was sold in 1948 to the Norwegian government and renamed Polarfront II to be used as a weather ship. She was sold in 1979 and scrapped the following year.

Royal Navy ship names